Melcior Mauri Prat (born 8 April 1966 in Vic) is a Spanish retired cyclist who won the 1991 Vuelta a España, as well as numerous smaller stage races, mainly due to his abilities as a time triallist. He won the silver medal at the time trial World Championship (1998), and was also Spanish national champion in this discipline (1995).

In November 2007 he won the second edition of the Titan Desert mountain bike 5 stage race over 293 km in Morocco.

Career achievements

Major results

1988
 3rd Circuito de Getxo
1990
 4th Overall Vuelta a Aragón
 7th Overall Volta a la Comunitat Valenciana
1991
 1st  Overall Vuelta a España
1st Stages 1 (TTT), 8 (ITT) & 19 (ITT)
 1st  Overall Volta a la Comunitat Valenciana
1st Stage 6
 Vuelta a Andalucía
1st Stages 3 & 6
 9th Grand Prix des Nations
1992
 1st  Overall Volta a la Comunitat Valenciana
1st Stage 5b (ITT)
 1st Stage 1 Vuelta Ciclista a La Rioja
 2nd Overall Tour du Limousin
 3rd Overall Vuelta a Murcia
1st Stage 4 (ITT)
 9th Grand Prix des Nations
1993
 3rd Overall Vuelta a Aragón
1st Stage 6
 7th Trofeo Masferrer
 8th Overall Vuelta a España
1st Stage 13 (ITT)
1994
 1st  Overall Vuelta a Castilla y León
 1st  Overall Vuelta a Murcia
 1st Klasika Primavera
 2nd Overall Vuelta a Aragón
 3rd Overall Tour de Luxembourg
 3rd Road race, National Road Championships
1995
 National Road Championships
1st  Time trial
5th Road race
 2nd Overall Volta a Catalunya
1st Stage 6 (ITT)
 4th Overall Vuelta a España
 6th Overall Tour de France
1996
 1st  Overall Vuelta a Aragón
1st Stage 4b (ITT)
 1st  Overall Vuelta a Murcia
1st Stage 5b (ITT)
 1st Stage 5b (ITT) Volta a la Comunitat Valenciana
 5th Trofeo Luis Puig
 6th Road race, Olympic Games
 7th Klasika Primavera
 10th Overall Setmana Catalana de Ciclisme
1997
 1st  Overall Circuit de la Sarthe
1st Stage 4 (ITT)
 1st Stage 9 (ITT) Vuelta a España
 UCI Road World Championships
5th Road race
6th Time trial
 7th Overall Setmana Catalana de Ciclisme
 8th Overall Escalada a Montjuïc
 9th Overall Tour du Limousin
1998
 1st  Overall Circuit de la Sarthe
1st Stage 4 (ITT)
 1st  Overall Volta ao Alentejo
1st Stage 5 (ITT)
 2nd  Time trial, UCI Road World Championships
 2nd Time trial, National Road Championships
 3rd Overall Escalada a Montjuïc
 4th Overall Vuelta a Castilla y León
 5th Overall Vuelta a Murcia
 8th Overall Grand Prix du Midi Libre
1st Stage 3 (ITT)
1999
 1st  Overall Volta ao Algarve
1st Stage 4 (ITT)
 2nd Overall Escalada a Montjuïc
1st Stage 1b (ITT)
 2nd Overall Volta ao Alentejo
 3rd Overall Volta a Portugal
1st Stage 13 (ITT)
 5th Time trial, UCI Road World Championships
 6th Overall Setmana Catalana de Ciclisme
 7th Overall Volta a la Comunitat Valenciana
2001
 3rd Overall Volta ao Algarve
 5th Overall Volta ao Alentejo

Grand Tour general classification results timeline

References

External links 
 Complete Palmarès
 
 Official Tour de France results for Melcior Mauri

Cyclists from Catalonia
Spanish male cyclists
1966 births
Living people
Vuelta a España winners
Spanish Vuelta a España stage winners
Olympic cyclists of Spain
Cyclists at the 1996 Summer Olympics
Sportspeople from Vic
S.L. Benfica (cycling)
20th-century Spanish people